The Jungle (1967) is a short film about gangs made by African American students under the direction of Temple University professor Harold Haskins.

Legacy
In 2009, it was added to the National Film Registry by the Library of Congress as being "culturally, historically or aesthetically" significant and will be preserved.

See also
The Cool World-1963 film by Shirley Clarke also on the Film Registry
Gang culture

References

External links
 
The Jungle essay by Daniel Eagan In America's Film Legacy, 2009-2010: A Viewer's Guide To The 50 Landmark Movies Added To The National Film Registry In 2009-10, Bloomsbury Publishing USA, 2011,  pages 111-114

1967 films
United States National Film Registry films
1960s short documentary films
Documentary films about African-American gangs
American student films
Temple University
1967 documentary films
American short documentary films
1960s American films